Bishopiana is a genus of Asian dwarf spiders that was first described by K. Y. Eskov in 1988.  it contains only two species: B. glumacea and B. hypoarctica.

See also
 List of Linyphiidae species

References

Araneomorphae genera
Linyphiidae
Spiders of China
Spiders of Russia